Crime Stories: India Detectives is a 2021 Indian Netflix original docuseries created and directed by N Amit and
Jack Rampling.The series was produced by Claire Cahill under the production banner Minnow Films. It stars N. Shashi Kumar, Roopa K. S. and Gopala Nayak. This four episodes Docu-series chronicles the workings of the Bengaluru city police as they attempt to solve four violent crimes; Three are related to murder and one involves the kidnapping of a child. It released via Netflix on 22 September 2021.

Synopsis 
The series follows an investigating team of four police stations who cracked three murders and one kidnapping case that came to light in early 2020 before the pandemic.

Cast 
 N. Shashi Kumar as Deputy Commissioner of Police
 Roopa K.S. as Sub Inspector
 Gopala Nayak as Police inspector
 V. Dhananjaya	as Assistant Commissioner of Police
 B.N. Lohith as Police Inspector
 Latha Mahesh as Sub Inspector

Episodes

Release 
On 14 September 2021, Netflix released the official trailer of the series. The series was worldwide premiered on 22 September 2021.

Reception 
Nandini Ramnath from Scroll.in gave a mixed review to the series and stated, "From murders to kidnapping, the hard-working, dedicated, intelligent, honest and caring men and women ensure that justice is served – at least, that’s what the show badly wants us to believe."

Karnataka newspaper, Deccan Herald gave 4/5 rating to the series, with a positive verdict and called, "This docu-series is more detailed and takes an intimate look at the criminal justice system as a whole, and policemen's careers marked with risk and uncertainty.

Anuj Kumar from The Hindu newspaper portal said, "Unlike the crime shows on general entertainment channels, here, craft gets as much importance as the cause. On a fundamental level, the four-episode series seeks to understand the anatomy of a crime, finding a beating heart inside the uniform; a human story in the First Information Report.

Legal issues 
On 2 October 2021, Karnataka High Court passed an interim order restricting Netflix from airing the first episode of the series, titled ‘A Murdered Mother’, based on the plea made by one of the accused. 

On 27 October 2021, the episode was again started streaming after the HC dismissal of the petition filed by Shridhar Rao, (a 28-year-old co-accused in the murder of 54-year-old Nirmala Chandrasekhar.)

References

External links 
 
 
 

Netflix original documentary television series
Indian documentary television series
True crime television series